The North Western Indian State of Rajasthan has over one hundred fortifications on hills and mountainous terrain. Six Hill Forts of Rajasthan, spread across Rajasthan state in northern India, have been clustered as a series and designated UNESCO World Heritage Site. The ‘Hill Forts of Rajasthan’ was initially submitted to the UNESCO as a serial property formed by five Rajput forts in the Aravalli Range, and were built and enhanced between the 5th and 18th centuries CE by several Rajput kings of different kingdoms. The UNESCO series has been increased to six forts. They consist of:

 Chittor Fort at Chittorgarh city
 Kumbhalgarh Fort at Rajsamand city
 Ranthambore Fort at Sawai Madhopur
 Gagron Fort at Jhalawar city
 Amer Fort at Jaipur city
 Jaisalmer Fort at Jaisalmer city
 Mehrangarh Fort at Jodhpur 

Some of these forts have defensive fortification wall up to 20 km long, still surviving urban centers and still in use water harvesting mechanism.

Selection 
A series was to be selected as a UNESCO World Heritage Site to highlight the culture and architecture of hilltop Rajput forts.

The State party of Rajasthan presented an overview of the process for the selection of component sites for the series of Hill Forts and the criteria selected. The criteria set resulting in the selection process followed the four following perimeters: The forts adapted to the Geography of the Hilltops, the fortifications were power centers, they included sacred grounds, and the fort was designed with urban settlements.

Rajputs adhered to architectural texts that categorized different typologies of fortifications based on their geography. The earliest literary references differentiated four types of forts; Hilltop Forts, Water Forts, Forest Forts, and Desert Forts. This series of world heritage sites was created solely on the Hilltop Forts of Rajasthan. This and excluded many forts solely based on typology such as Junagarh Fort which is a ground fort. Furthermore forts that were not designed for urban settlement were excluded. Mehrangarh, although situated on a hilltop, was a fortified citadel for the court which lacked an urban settlement for the civilians.

An initial list Forts of Rajasthan was created based on all forts recorded by the Archaeological Survey of India. Of the hundreds of fortifications, 54 forts were further examined as they shared integral characteristics of Rajput military architecture. The State party explained how from this initial listing, a smaller group was selected made of 24 of the most significant forts of Rajasthan which all shared key aspects of Rajput Fortifications. This number was soon shortlisted to 13. From this list five forts were initially selected, all of which were located on the Aravalli Range, and belonged to different clans. The sixth fort, Jaisalmer was later added into the series.

Gallery

References

External links 
 The Hill Forts of Rajasthan

Hill forts
 
R
F
Rajasthan-related lists
World Heritage Sites in India